Cryptocephalus lefevrei is a species of leaf-beetle from Southern India.

References 

lefevrei
Beetles described in 1895